Adatanserin (WY-50,324, SEB-324) is a mixed 5-HT1A receptor partial agonist and 5-HT2A and 5-HT2C receptor antagonist. It was under development by Wyeth as an antidepressant but was ultimately not pursued.

Adantaserin has been shown to be neuroprotective against ischemia-induced glutamatergic excitotoxicity, an effect which appears to be mediated by blockade of the 5-HT2A receptor.

See also
 Flibanserin

References

5-HT1A agonists
5-HT2A antagonists
5-HT2C antagonists
Abandoned drugs
Adamantanes
Carboxamides
Piperazines
Aminopyrimidines